Krystian Palacz (born 19 July 2003) is a Polish professional footballer who plays as a left-back for Polish club Sandecja Nowy Sącz, on loan from Lech Poznań.

Career statistics

Club

References

External links

2003 births
Living people
Footballers from Poznań
Polish footballers
Poland youth international footballers
Association football defenders
Lech Poznań II players
Lech Poznań players
Sandecja Nowy Sącz players
Ekstraklasa players
I liga players
II liga players